The Noosa Triathlon is an annual standard distance triathlon (1500m swim, 40 km bike, 10 km run) held in Noosa, in the Australian state of Queensland and organised by the World Triathlon Corporation. Since its first race in 1983 the competition has evolved from a single day race into an annual five-day multisport festival celebrating sports participation, healthy lifestyles, fitness and fun. The feature event on the final day of the festival is the Noosa Triathlon.

In 2009 as part of the Q150 celebrations, the Noosa Triathlon was announced as one of the Q150 Icons of Queensland for its role as an "event and festival".

Winners

Professional men

Professional women

Golden Legends
Participants who have completed the event 30 times as individuals are awarded "Golden Legend" status. Standard "Legends Club" membership is after 10 events (recipients too numerous to list presently).

ITU Events held in conjunction with the Noosa Triathlon

Men

Women

References

External links
 Noosa Triathlon Multisport Festival website
 Noosa Triathlon Results Fansite

Sport in the Sunshine Coast, Queensland
Sports competitions in Queensland
Triathlon competitions in Australia
Recurring sporting events established in 1983
Shire of Noosa